"What You Are" is a song by American rock band Audioslave. It was released in March 2004 as the fifth and final single from their self-titled debut. It peaked at number 17 on the U.S. Modern Rock Tracks chart. The song's meaning is described as being a way to ditch an "evil woman". The song was also used in a TV spot for the movie Spider-Man 2.

Charts

References

Audioslave songs
2004 singles
Song recordings produced by Rick Rubin
Songs written by Chris Cornell
2002 songs
Epic Records singles